Frank H. Reid (1844 – July 20, 1898) was an American soldier, teacher, city engineer, vigilante, and one of the  combatants in the shootout on Juneau Wharf that ended the life of American outlaw Jefferson "Soapy" Smith, as well as Reid's own life.

Early life
Reid was born in Illinois about 1844. He enlisted in the army and became a lieutenant for a company of Oregon volunteers. In the 1870s, he studied engineering and then became a teacher in Linn County, Oregon, District 29.

Career
During the Klondike Gold Rush, he settled in Skagway, Alaska, where he worked as a bartender at the Klondike saloon, believed to have been owned by Soapy Smith. On August 18, 1897, he was appointed town surveyor and helped map the town of Skagway. At some point, Reid joined the vigilante committee known as the 101.

Death
On the evening of July 8, 1898, he was assigned to guard the entrance of Juneau Wharf, along with Josias Martin Tanner, Jesse Murphy and John Landers, to keep Soapy Smith and his men from entering a meeting being held by the 101 at the opposite end of the wharf. Smith arrived at the scene and assaulted Reid, which started what is historically known as the Shootout on Juneau Wharf. Smith died at the scene, while Reid lay wounded in the hospital for 12 days before dying on July 20, 1898.

References

Bibliography
 

1844 births
1898 deaths
American surveyors
Deaths by firearm in Alaska
People from Illinois
People from Linn County, Oregon
People from the Municipality of Skagway Borough, Alaska
United States Army soldiers
American vigilantes
People of the Klondike Gold Rush
Gunslingers of the American Old West